The 2015 Stony Brook Seawolves football team represented Stony Brook University in the 2015 NCAA Division I FCS football season. The Seawolves competed as third year members of the Colonial Athletic Association with Chuck Priore as the head coach for his tenth season. They played their home games at Kenneth P. LaValle Stadium in Stony Brook, New York. They finished the season 5–5, 3–5 in CAA play to finish in a four-way tie for seventh place.

Schedule

Source: Schedule
The game was delayed due to thunderstorms at 7:51 PM, and resumed at around 9:50 PM.  It was halted again just before the start of the second half and was then suspended at around 12:13 AM. Toledo was leading Stony Brook 16–7 prior to the game being suspended. Toledo wanted to resume the game the next day, but Stony Brook feared its players would not have been able to get home at a reasonable hour.  As there was no room to make the game up later in the season, it was officially declared "no contest."

Game summaries

at Toledo

This game was suspended just before the start of the second half due to thunderstorms.  It had been delayed three times due to lightning.  The Rockets wanted to finish the game the next day, but this would have forced Stony Brook to miss its chartered flight and take an 11-hour bus ride back to Long Island.  Stony Brook officials felt this was an unacceptable risk to their players' safety.  There was no room in the schedule to finish the game, and it was officially declared "no contest."

Central Connecticut

New Hampshire

William & Mary

at James Madison

Towson

at Maine

Elon

Howard

at Rhode Island

Albany

References

Stony Brook
Stony Brook Seawolves football seasons
Stony Brook Seawolves football